The 2017 season was KA's first season back in the Úrvalsdeild following their relegation in 2004, their 16th season in the top flight of Icelandic football. KA finished the previous season in the first place in 1.deild which secured them a place in the 2017 season of the Úrvalsdeild.

Squad 

(captain)

Out on loan

Transfers

Winter 

In:

Out:

Summer 

In:

Out:

Competitions

Úrvalsdeild

Results summary

Results by round

Table

Icelandic cup

Squad statistics

Appearances and goals 

|-
|colspan="14"|Players who left KA during the season:

|}

Goal scorers

Disciplinary record

References

External links
   

Knattspyrnufélag Akureyrar
Knattspyrnufélag Akureyrar seasons
Icelandic football club seasons
Knat